Sing My Song is a Chinese reality talent show that premiered on 3 January 2014 on CCTV-3 (Arts and Entertainment) channel sponsored by Hangzhou Wahaha Group and Wahaha Joint Venture Company. The series is produced by the same team that produced The Voice of China and retains some of that show's format; however, a major difference is that contestants in Sing My Song must perform their original composition rather than covering songs by other artists.

Format
The series consists of three phases: the audition called "the recordings", a battle phase called "the singles", and a final called "the song". The four producers choose teams of contestants through a blind audition process. Each producer has the length of the auditioner's performance to decide if he or she wants that singer-songwriter's self-written, composed, and song sung on his or her album. If two or more producers want the same contestant (which happens frequently), the singer-songwriter has the final choice of producer.

Overview

Tutors

Finalists of each team
Note: The green background is the winning team, and the champion is bold.

Season

International versions

United Kingdom 
In April 2014 UK's ITV announced that there would be a British version of Sing My Song, The British Song. It is the first time that a British television network bought the distribution originally from China.

Vietnam 
In 2016, there was a Vietnamese version of Sing My Song, named Sing My Song Vietnam. It was produced by Cattiensa Media and aired on VTV3. The first season of the program was broadcast from November 20, 2016 to January 22, 2017.

See also
Sing My Song (season 1)
Sing My Song (season 2)
Sing My Song (season 3)

References

External links 
 

2014 Chinese television series debuts
Chinese reality television series
Chinese music television series
Chinese-language television shows
China Central Television original programming
2016 Chinese television series endings